The Santa Bárbara Regional Airport is an airport located in Santa Bárbara, Guerrero, Mexico. It serves the city of Ciudad Altamirano, Guerrero.
The airport is located about 3 km east of the city of Ciudad Altamirano.
Currently, there are no scheduled air carriers who serve the airport. Its main air traffic is general aviation and military aviation. There are an average of five landings per week, with its busiest season being December, in which average operations reach up to three operations per day.

References

External links

Airports in Guerrero